Directive 89/391/EEC is a European Union directive with the objective to introduce measures to encourage improvements in the safety and health of workers at work. It is described as a "Framework Directive" for occupational safety and health (OSH) by the European Agency for Safety and Health at Work.

History and effect
The proposal for the directive was adopted by the European Commission on 24 February 1988 and transmitted to the European Parliament and the Council of the European Union, which consulted the European Economic and Social Committee. The proposal was approved with amendments in the first and second readings by the European Parliament, after which the Commission adopted amended proposals. The Council approved the re-examined proposal on 12 June 1989.

Directive 89/391/EEC entered into force on 19 June 1989 and member states were obligated to bring into force laws, regulations and administrative provisions to comply with it by 31 December 1992.

The directive was amended three times by legal acts, in 2003, 2007, and 2008.

Directive 89/391/EEC was listed among the ten EU legal acts that most improved the lives of people in the European Union according to a 2016 survey of 72 members of the European Parliament by Die Tageszeitung.

Individual directives
The directive authorizes the Council of the European Union to adopt individual directives in areas listed in its annex. As of 2018, 20 individual directives were adopted:
first individual directive: Directive 89/654/EEC concerning the minimum safety and health requirements for the workplace
second individual directive: Directive 2009/104/EC concerning the minimum safety and health requirements for the use of work equipment by workers at work
third individual directive: Directive 89/656/EEC on the minimum health and safety requirements for the use by workers of personal protective equipment at the workplace
fourth individual directive: Directive 90/269/EEC on the minimum health and safety requirements for the manual handling of loads where there is a risk particularly of back injury to workers
fifth individual directive: Directive 90/270/EEC on the minimum safety and health requirements for work with display screen equipment
sixth individual directive: Directive 2004/37/EC on the protection of workers from the risks related to exposure to carcinogens or mutagens at work
seventh individual directive: Directive 2000/54/EC on the protection of workers from risks related to exposure to biological agents at work
eighth individual directive: Directive 92/57/EEC on the implementation of minimum safety and health requirements at temporary or mobile construction sites
ninth individual directive: Directive 92/58/EEC on the minimum requirements for the provision of safety and/or health signs at work
tenth individual directive: Directive 92/85/EEC on the introduction of measures to encourage improvements in the safety and health at work of pregnant workers and workers who have recently given birth or are breastfeeding
eleventh individual directive: Directive 92/91/EEC concerning the minimum requirements for improving the safety and health protection of workers in the mineral- extracting industries through drilling
twelfth individual directive: Directive 92/104/EEC on the minimum requirements for improving the safety and health protection of workers in surface and underground mineral-extracting industries
thirteenth individual directive: Directive 93/103/EC concerning the minimum safety and health requirements for work on board fishing vessels
fourteenth individual directive: Directive 98/24/EC on the protection of the health and safety of workers from the risks related to chemical agents at work
fifteenth individual directive: Directive 1999/92/EC on minimum requirements for improving the safety and health protection of workers potentially at risk from explosive atmospheres
sixteenth individual directive: Directive 2002/44/EC on the minimum health and safety requirements regarding the exposure of workers to the risks arising from physical agents (vibration)
seventeenth individual directive: Directive 2003/10/EC on the minimum health and safety requirements regarding the exposure of workers to the risks arising from physical agents (noise)
eighteenth individual directive: Directive 2004/40/EC on the minimum health and safety requirements regarding the exposure of workers to the risks arising from physical agents (electromagnetic fields)
This directive has been repealed by the twentieth individual directive.
nineteenth individual directive: Directive 2006/25/EC on the minimum health and safety requirements regarding the exposure of workers to risks arising from physical agents (artificial optical radiation)
twentieth individual directive: Directive 2013/35/EU on the minimum health and safety requirements regarding the exposure of workers to the risks arising from physical agents (electromagnetic fields)

See also
European labour law
List of European Union directives

References

External links
Directive 89/391/EEC

1989 in law
1989 in the European Economic Community
89 391
European Union employment directives
Health and the European Union
Occupational safety and health law